Ian Andrew Mork (born January 1, 1972), is an American soccer coach.  He played professionally in the National Professional Soccer League.

Player
Ian Mork was born on January 1, 1972, in Wichita, Kansas. In 1991, he played soccer for Johnson County Community College. He then transferred to Sangamon State University In 1994, Monk turned professional with the Wichita Wings in the National Professional Soccer League. Since then, he has played for Quick Boys, an amateur team in the Dutch Hoofdklasse and the San Pedro Dolphins in the Premier League of Belize. Mork has also played in the San Francisco Premier League and Marin Soccer League in northern California.

He was also the captain of the first team from Wichita (Wichita North - 1990) to win a state title in class 6A.

Coach
Monk has been head coach of the Ballistic United soccer academy in California since 2006. In 2009, he became the head coach of the Belize national team. That year, Belize competed in the UNCAF Nations Cup, finishing at the bottom of Group A with one point after three games. Mork was also in charge of Belize during its 2010 FIFA World Cup qualification campaign and was appointed to lead Belize in the 2013 CONCACAF Gold Cup.

He holds a UEFA B-license.

References

1972 births
Living people
American soccer coaches
American soccer players
American expatriate soccer players
National Professional Soccer League (1984–2001) players
Soccer players from Wichita, Kansas
Wichita Wings (NPSL) players
Belize national football team managers
Johnson County Community College people
American expatriate soccer coaches
Association footballers not categorized by position
San Pedro Seadogs FC players